The Biccherna was the magistrate or chancellery of finance from the 13th to the 14th century for the republic and then city of Siena, region of Tuscany, Italy. 

The records of the office are significant not only because Siena was one of the earliest and most important banking centers of medieval Europe, but also because the books that contain these records were bound with painted leather covers, often made by major artists. These covers tend to display secular subject matter that glorifies the city's government and its citizens. 

Many of these covers are displayed in the Archives of the State of Siena located in the Palazzo Piccolomini located on via Banchi di Sotto corner via Rinaldini.

Gallery

References

Republic of Siena